Bedside Press was a comics publishing company founded in 2014 by Hope Nicholson and based in Winnipeg, Manitoba, Canada. Founded in 2014, Bedside Press published a diverse range of comic and prose works including anthology collections like The Secret Loves of Geek Girls, and historical reprints such as the adventures of Brok Windsor. Bedside Press also published new content by up-and-coming artists/writers, and established creators including Margaret Atwood, Trina Robbins, and Roberta Gregory.

In November 2019, Bedside Press ceased operations after publisher Nicholson confessed to sexual misconduct and assault.

See also

Canadian comics

References

External links
 

Comic book publishing companies of Canada
2014 establishments in Manitoba

Defunct companies based in Winnipeg
Mass media in Winnipeg
Publishing companies based in Manitoba
Defunct mass media in Manitoba